Filabusi is a town in the Matabeleland South Province of Zimbabwe. The town is the district capital of Insiza District and a service centre for the surrounding mining and farming areas.

Location
The geographical coordinates of Filabusi are 20°31'46.0"S, 29°17'12.0"E (Latitude:-20.529444; Longitude:29.286667).

Overview
The town of Filabusi is supplied with water from a weir on the Insiza River. The Filabusi Mining District was a major producer of gold, with mines such as Fred and Royal Family. Nickel was mined at Epoch Mines, owned by Bindura Nickel Corporation.  Asbestos was also  mined at Pangani and Croft. However all these large scale mining operations are now closed, with mining in the district limited to small scale artisanal gold mining.

Population
The 2012 national population census put the population of Filabusi at 1,756 inhabitants.

Agriculture

Agriculture in the Filabusi area is mostly cattle ranching, with some small-scale farming (see photo), the latter mainly on land expropriated from Caucasian settlers, as part of the Fast Track Land Reform Programme (FTLRP).

Other considerations
The town hosts a hospital; the Filabusi District Hospital and a high school, the Filabusi High School. There are two private surgeries and a retail pharmacy.  Filabusi is also home to Godlwayo Culture Centre, which hosted the 2016 Annual Zimbabwe Culture Week.

See also
 List of cities and towns in Zimbabwe

References

External links
 Filabusi Memorial and the Edkins Store Killings

Insiza District
Populated places in Matabeleland South Province